Hawthorne Christian Academy (HCA) is a private, co-educational Christian school serving students in preschool through 12th grade. The Academy is run by the Hawthorne Gospel Church, and is located on Route 208 in Hawthorne, New Jersey, United States. The school opened in 1981 and had its first graduating class eight years later.

As of the 2019–20 school year, the school had an enrollment of 359 students (plus 40 in PreK) and 43.3 classroom teachers (on an FTE basis), for a student–teacher ratio of 8.3:1. The school's student body was 48.5% (174) White, 21.2% (76) Asian, 17.0% (61) Hispanic, 11.1% (40) Black, 1.4% (5) Native Hawaiian / Pacific Islander, 0.6% (2) two or more races and 0.3% (1) American Indian / Alaska Native.

HCA has been accredited by the Middle States Association of Colleges and Schools Commission on Elementary and Secondary Schools since 1996 and is accredited until January 2024. The school has been accredited by the Association of Christian Schools International since 1981.

Academics
All students are offered strong academic courses from a Christian perspective. The Academy pushes technological studies, and fine arts classes. Students have the opportunity to engage in Visual and Musical Arts. Through these programs, they are encouraged to compete in various competitions that will help grow and better their skills. HCA contains a large media center in the Youth Ministries Center (YMC) building that is open to all students and faculty when needed.

Athletics
The Hawthore Christian Academy Defenders participate in the North Jersey Interscholastic Conference, which is comprised of small-enrollment schools in Bergen, Hudson, Morris and Passaic counties, and was created following a reorganization of sports leagues in Northern New Jersey by the New Jersey State Interscholastic Athletic Association (NJSIAA). With 100 students in grades 10-12, the school was classified by the NJSIAA for the 2019–20 school year as Non-Public B for most athletic competition purposes, which included schools with an enrollment of 37 to 366 students in that grade range (equivalent to Group I for public schools).

The school participates as the host school / lead agency in a joint baseball team with Eastern Christian High School. In turn, Eastern Christian is the host school for a joint softball team. These co-op programs operate under agreements scheduled to expire at the end of the 2023–24 school year.

References

External links 

Data for Hawthorne Christian Academy, National Center for Education Statistics

Christian schools in New Jersey
1981 establishments in New Jersey
Educational institutions established in 1981
Private elementary schools in New Jersey
Private high schools in Passaic County, New Jersey
Private middle schools in New Jersey